Don Perlin (born August 27, 1929) is an American comic book artist, writer, and editor. He is best known for Marvel Comics' Werewolf by Night, Moon Knight (a character he co-created), The Defenders, and Ghost Rider. In the 1990s, he worked for Valiant Comics, both as artist and editor, where he co-created Bloodshot.

Biography

Early life and career
Perlin was born in New York City, and grew up in the Canarsie neighborhood of the borough of Brooklyn. At 14, he began studying art under Burne Hogarth, who taught small private classes at either his Central Park West apartment or at a rented "loft in a small building up on upper Broadway in Manhattan and on Saturday mornings we had about half a dozen students." One of them, future comics artist Al Williamson, became a friend and colleague. As the class expanded and became affiliated with the Stevenson School, Perlin could no longer afford to attend and left; he later returned as a student when Hogarth co-founded the Cartoonists and Illustrators School.

He broke into the industry in the late 1940s, later recalling, "My first job was for a company called Fox Features. It was one of those cops-and-robbers stories. I pencilled it, Pete Morisi inked it." Credits were not routinely given in most comics until the 1960s, making identification difficult, and Perlin's first confirmed work is penciling and inking the seven-page story, "Ghosts From the Underworld", by an unknown writer, in the publisher Youthful's Captain Science #3 (cover-dated April 1951). Through 1952, he did some comics work for Ziff-Davis, Hillman Periodicals and Stanley Morse, before finding his niche penciling horror-comics stories for Harvey Comics, St. John Publications, Comic Media, and the 1950s iteration of Marvel Comics, known as Atlas Comics. He recalled he spent three weeks as a ghost artist pencilling over Jules Feiffer's layouts on Will Eisner's newspaper-insert comics feature The Spirit. As he recalled the experience,

Around this time, Perlin, Morisi and Sy Barry rented a one-room studio near Cooper Union in Manhattan for $35 a month, later renting space to artist Al Gordon. The group gave up the studio in 1953 when Perlin was drafted into the United States Army.

From 1955 to 1958, Perlin concentrated on war comics for Charlton Comics, while also turning in the occasional assignment for Atlas. His credited output slowed after that, and he took on work in technical illustrating and package design for several years. He recalled,

Doing comics in the evenings after work, he drew Robur the Conqueror, an adaptation of a Jules Verne novel about a power-mad genius and his "flying apparatus", for The Gilberton Company's Classics Illustrated #162, with the first of its three printings cover-dated May 1961. In 1962 he began an 11-year stint drawing almost exclusively for Charlton, across a variety of genres, from war to romance comics to hot-rod sports stories. Occasional artwork for other companies included the TV-series tie-in Hogan's Heroes #4 (March 1967), for Dell Comics, and comics biographies of Thurgood Marshall and Dr. Martin Luther King Jr. for Fitzgerald Publications.

Later career
In 1974 he began a long association with Marvel, where he was a full-time penciler until 1987. He earlier had freelanced, initially on a Dr. Strange story by writer Gardner Fox in Marvel Premiere #5 (Nov. 1972), inking Sam Kweskin (credited as "Irv Wesley"), and co-penciling two issues of Thor with John Buscema in 1973, among other work, including a smattering for rival DC Comics' supernatural anthologies. He had continued in commercial art and package design as his primary employment all these years, Perlin recalled, when had an offer to return to comics full-time:

Perlin drew Werewolf by Night #17–43 (May 1974 – March 1977), a run that introduced the character Moon Knight, co-created with writer Doug Moench. He went on to become the regular artist for the supernatural-motorcyclist series Ghost Rider from 1977 to 1981, and a handful of other issues through 1983. He also contributed stories starring characters including the Inhumans, Spider-Man, and the Sub-Mariner.

Perlin and writer Roger McKenzie developed the idea of Captain America running for the office of President of the United States. Marvel originally rejected the idea but it would be used later by Roger Stern and John Byrne in Captain America #250 (Oct. 1980). McKenzie and Perlin received credit for the idea on the letters page at Stern's insistence. McKenzie and Perlin would also receive credit in the follow-up story in What If? #26 (April 1981).

In 1980, Perlin began working on Man-Thing with Chris Claremont, beginning with a crossover with Doctor Strange and continuing until the second to last issue of the series in 1981.  From 1980–1986, Perlin was the regular (and longest-serving) artist on the superhero-team title The Defenders, which Perlin said gave him "a chance to draw almost every character Marvel had at one time or another." Perlin penciled Transformers for nearly two years from early 1986 to late 1987, and then became Marvel's de facto managing art director, a role he served from 1987–1991:

He joined Jim Shooter's Valiant Comics in 1991, pencilling the series Solar, Man of the Atom and Bloodshot and editing Solar, Man of the Atom, Shadowman, and Magnus Robot Fighter. Shortly after Valiant's mid-1990s takeover by Acclaim Entertainment, Perlin went into semi-retirement. His last known published comics work is penciling and inking the 12-page story "Caves of Castle Finn" in DC Comics' TV-animation tie-in Scooby-Doo #25 (Aug. 1999).

Awards
Perlin won the 1997 National Cartoonists Society Comic Books Award.

Personal life
Perlin is married to a woman named Becky Perlin. The couple has two daughters and three sons.

Bibliography of series as regular artist
 Ghost Rider #26–34, 36–42, 45–60 (Oct. 1977 – Sept. 1981), #67 (April 1982), #71 (Aug. 1982), #76–77 (Jan.–Feb. 1983)
 The Defenders: layouts finished by others including Joe Sinnott, Jim Mooney, Pablo Marcos, and Bob Wiacek, #82–111 and 113; full pencils #112, 114–118, 120–125, 129, 132, 134–145, 147, 149–152 (April 1980 – Feb. 1986).
 Transformers: #13–15, 17–19, 21–32, 35 (Feb. 1986 – Dec. 1987) (breakdowns only #31–32)
 Transformers: The Movie: layouts only #1–3 (Dec. 1986 – Feb. 1987)
 Werewolf by Night #17–43 (May 1974 – March 1977)
 Man-Thing Vol. 2 #4-8, 10 (May 1980-May 1981)

References

External links
 

1929 births
Artists from New York City
American comics artists
Living people
Marvel Comics people
Silver Age comics creators